Leila and the Wolves (ليلى والذئاب) is a 1984 drama film from Lebanese director Heiny Srour and assistant director Sabah Jabbour.

It was filmed in often treacherous areas and the filming lasted seven years. In the film, the protagonist Leila, a modern Lebanese woman living in London, time travels through the 1900s to the 1980s, with each trip focusing on the centrality of women in Palestinian and Lebanese resistance movements. The film won the Grand Prize in the Third World competition at the International Filmfestival Mannheim-Heidelberg.

References

1984 films
Lebanese drama films